Lifford Greyhound Stadium is a greyhound racing track located in Lifford, County Donegal, Ireland.

The facilities include the Champion Stakes Restaurant, fast food facilities, a number of bars, totalisator betting and seating. Racing takes place every Friday and Sunday (it was formerly held on Saturday evenings).

Race distances are 325, 525, 550, 575 and 750 yards.

History
The Lifford Greyhound Stadium was built in 1959 when cattle dealer James Magee decided to convert some more of his grazing land from a schooling track into a professional 495 yard circumference circuit. Magee died in 1971 and his sons Cathal and Seamus took over the track as the Racing and General Managers around the same time that a new stand was erected at the venue.

The main event originally held at the track was the Irwin Cup but it did not feature highly on the Irish racing calendar and during the late 1970s an event called the Abraham David Trophy was contested featuring significant prize money. Many top greyhounds have appeared here including Yellow Printer who began his career at Lifford as a puppy. Race distances were 350, 525, 550, 575, 750 and 820 yards.

After 32 years association the track was put up for sale by the Magee family in 1991 and was eventually bought by new owners in 2001 when Willie, Hugh and Patrick Duffy formed the Lifford Greyhound Racing Company. On 11 September 2003 the track re-opened after undergoing a €12m refit with a new grandstand, two restaurants and improved facilities.

Closure and reopening
During 2018, the stadium was put up for sale at a price of 1.9 million euros. The following year it was announced that the last race meeting would be on Saturday 17 August 2019 before the stadium was closed. Racing Manager Matthew Duffy blamed the lack of support from the Irish Greyhound Board.

During October 2021 it was confirmed that the track would reopen on Sunday 6 March 2022. The racing was brought back by a syndicate called the Lifford Greyhound Racing Club - Canaradzo Ltd headed by Harry Findlay. The track reopened for trials on 29 March (slightly later than planned). However, despite trials taking place the first race meeting was delayed further and the date put back until 2 April 2023.

Track records

Current records

Former records

References

External links
Irish Greyhound Board

Greyhound racing venues in the Republic of Ireland